Ikamatua is a small village on the West Coast of the South Island in New Zealand. Its name translates literally as ika (fish) and matua (mature/parent). It may be a contraction of Te Ika-a-matua, fish of my ancestor.

It has a population of under 200.

In 1946, 4 km north of Ikamatua, the floating Grey River gold dredge dug its way across State Highway 7, and the main Greymouth to Westport railway link, to move into its new mining area in the Blackwater Valley. This was the first and only time that such an event has occurred in New Zealand.

In 1906 Ikamatua had two sawmills, a creamery, a railway station and a school.

References

External links

 more information on Ikamatua

Buller District
Populated places in the West Coast, New Zealand